Mona Nabil Demaidi, is an entrepreneur and women’s rights advocate. She was born in December 14, 1988 in Nablus, Palestine. She obtained her Ph.D. in Advanced Software Engineering and Machine Learning, MSc with distinction in Software Engineering and Data Management from the University of Manchester, UK. Dr. Mona joined an-Najah National University in 2016, to become the youngest female with a Ph.D. certificate at the Faculty of Engineering and Information Technology in Palestine. In 2014, she became a member of Women in Engineering, and Arab Women in Computing.

Biography

In 1993 she moved with her family to Dundee, UK and did her primary school at Hawkhill School and Park Place School. 
Demaidi finished high school and undergraduate studies in computer engineering in Palestine.
Mona Demaidi took her Bachelor of Science (BSs) in Computer Engineering at An-Najah National University located in Nablus, Palestine. After getting her Master of Science degree in Advance Software Engineering and Data Management in 2010/11 at The University of Manchester, she pursued her education and obtained her Doctor of Philosophy in Artificial Intelligence till 2015.

Experience
Mona Demaidi is the Director of the NGate Business Innovation and Technology Hub as well as the Deputy chairwoman and Advisory Board Member of the Intersect Innovation Hub at West Bank. Moreover, she’s a committee member for both ABET and Innovation and Entrepreneurship as well as being an assistant Professor at An-Najah National University. Also, Demaidi plays an important role in the IEEE Palestine Subsection as she’s the Chairwoman, Student Branch Counselor and a previous judge at the end of 2019. In addition to that, she was or currently is a judge in several foundations including the Hult Prize Foundation, flow accelerator and Code Your Future. Mona is also a Co-Founder for VTech Road  and a Co-Managing Director for Girls in Tech, Inc. Demaidi is the Chairwoman of the Institute of Electrical and Electronics Engineers in Palestine and was the first woman to be granted an award from the Institute of Electrical and Electronics Engineers (senior membership). She also became the co-managing director for Girls in Tech in Palestine. Demaidi is also a researcher as she has issued six journal papers and a book Terminological Ontology Evaluator in eLearning on constructing online learning platforms using machine learning. Mona Demaidi developed the National Artificial Intelligence Strategy for Palestine in 2022.

Recognition
Since 2014, Demaidi has been a board member with Women in Engineering and Arab Women in computing. In 2017, “she became the first female chair for the Institute of Electrical and Electronics Engineers (IEEE) in Palestine.” Later she became the first woman to be awarded the senior membership from IEEE. In 2019, she became the Co-Managing Director for Girls in Tech in Palestine, which was “the first Girls in Tech chapter in the Middle East - North Africa (MENA) region.”

She was awarded for the Machine Learning project “Skin Cancer detection,” in World Summit on the Information Society Prizes 2020.

She was one of the representatives of the Palestinian team of An-Najah National University at the 6th Annual International Conferences for Arab Women in Computing in March 2019.

See also
Sanaa Alsarghali

References

Palestinian activists
Software engineers
Living people
1988 births
Women in computing